Mannai Thottu Kumbidanum is a 1995 Tamil language drama film directed by R. Umashankar, who had previously directed the film Thambi Oorukku Pudhusu (1991). The film stars Selva and Keerthana, with Rajesh, Rocky, Goundamani, Senthil, Vadivukkarasi and Kamala Kamesh playing supporting roles. It was released on 16 December 1995.

Plot

Sathyamoorthy is a kind-hearted village chief who helps the poor villagers whereas Nallathambi is a heartless rich landlord who spreads terror among the villagers. His son Ramachandran and Rasathi fall in love with each other. When Sathyamoorthy becomes paralyzed, Ramachandran becomes the new village chief. In the meantime, Nallathambi wants to destroy Sathyamoorthy's family. What transpires next forms the rest of the story.

Cast

Selva as Ramachandran
Keerthana as Rasathi
Rajesh as Sathyamoorthy
Rocky as Nallathambi
Goundamani as Desingu
Senthil as Tyre (Rajadhi Raja  Raja Maarthanda  Raja Gambeera  Raja Kulothunga  Kathavaraya Krishna Kamaraj)
Vadivukkarasi
Kamala Kamesh as Nallathambi's mother
Varalakshmi as Rasathi's mother
Thideer Kannaiah as Mannaru
Bayilvan Ranganathan
Premi
Devisri
Sharmili
Kavithasri
Vasanth
Joker Thulasi

Soundtrack

The film score and the soundtrack were composed by Deva. The soundtrack, released in 1995, features 5 tracks with lyrics written by Vaali, Piraisoodan and Kalidasan.

References

1995 films
1990s Tamil-language films
Films scored by Deva (composer)